Bob or Robert Lambert may refer to:

Bob Lambert (cricketer) (1874–1956), Irish cricketer
Bob Lambert (undercover police officer), British academic and former undercover police officer who joined the Metropolitan Police Service in London in 1977 
Bob Lambert (executive) (c. 1957–2012), American media executive
Robert Lambert (speedway rider) (born 1998), British speedway rider
Robert Lambert (politician), Irish Sinn Féin politician
Robert Lambert (Royal Navy officer) (1771–1836), British admiral